Suad Sahiti (born 6 February 1995) is a Kosovan professional footballer who plays as a right winger for Kosovo Superleague club Llapi.

Club career

Early career
At the age of seven, Sahiti started playing football in Ramiz Sadiku, where after ten years he moved to Marseille, where he stayed for a year and was close to signing a professional contract which was rejected by his agent. In April 2014, Sahiti after returning to Kosovo and joined Hajvalia, together with his brother Emir was in the test to Belgian team Standard Liège, but unfortunately this test failed even though it was warned that they would sign contract.

Rabotnički
On 2 September 2014, Sahiti signed a two-year contract with Macedonian First Football League club Rabotnički. On 5 October 2014, he made his debut in a 1–2 away win against Metalurg Skopje after coming on as a substitute at 77th minute in place of Marjan Altiparmakovski. On 23 July 2015, Sahiti scored his first goal for Rabotnički in his 18th appearance for the club in a 2–0 home win over the Latvian side Jelgava in 2015–16 UEFA Europa League second qualifying round.

Skënderbeu Korçë
On 28 August 2017, Sahiti signed a three-year contract with Kategoria Superiore club Skënderbeu Korçë, to replace the departed Liridon Latifi as the second choice. His debut with Skënderbeu Korçë came nine days later in the 2017–18 Albanian Cup first round against Adriatiku Mamurras after being named in the starting line-up.

AEL
On 3 July 2018, Sahiti signed a three-year contract with Superleague Greece club AEL. On 25 August 2018, he made his debut in a 0–1 away win against Apollon Smyrni after being named in the starting line-up. On 29 January 2019, Sahiti disconnected the contract with AEL due to accumulation of financial arrears against him.

Septemvri Sofia
On 15 February 2019, Sahiti joined Bulgarian First League side Septemvri Sofia. Ten days later, he made his debut in a 0–0 home draw against Vitosha Bistritsa after coming on as a substitute at 82nd minute in place of Boris Galchev. On 12 April 2019, Sahiti scored his first goal for Septemvri Sofia in his fifth appearance for the club in a 1–0 home win over Lokomotiv Plovdiv in Bulgarian First League.

Wisła Płock
On 24 July 2019, Sahiti joined Ekstraklasa side Wisła Płock after agreeing to a one-year deal with the option of continuation for another season and received squad number 44. On 18 August 2019, he made his debut in a 1–0 away defeat against Piast Gliwice after coming on as a substitute at 72nd minute in place of Ricardinho.

Zrinjski Mostar
On 1 October 2020, Sahiti signed a two-year contract with Bosnian Premier League club Zrinjski Mostar. Fifteen days later, he made his debut in a 0–4 away win against Tuzla City after coming on as a substitute at 86th minute in place of Miloš Filipović.

Šibenik
On 4 March 2021, Sahiti signed a two-year contract with Croatian First Football League club Šibenik and received squad number 77. He found his brother Emir who was part of Šibenik as loan from Hajduk Split. One day later, he made his debut in a 3–2 away defeat against Istra 1961 after coming on as a substitute at 67th minute in place of Ignacio Bailone.

International career

Macedonia
On 21 March 2016, Sahiti received a call-up from Macedonia U21 for 2017 UEFA European Under-21 Championship qualification matches against Iceland U21 and France U21, but even though he was part of the team he could not play due to problems with documentation, namely the lack of passport. After receiving the passport he was on the plans of the Macedonia national senior team which was led by Igor Angelovski who during time of he was part of Rabotnički, Angelovski was head coach, but there was no official call-up.

Kosovo
On 8 November 2017, Sahiti switched his allegiance to Kosovo and received the call-up for the friendly match against Latvia, and made his debut after coming on as a substitute at 75th minute in place of Milot Rashica.

Personal life
Sahiti was born in Belgrade, FR Yugoslavia to Albanian parents from Medveđa, and is the older brother of Kosovo international Emir Sahiti. He holds Kosovan, Macedonian, and Albanian passports.

Career statistics

Club

International

Honours
Rabotnički
Macedonian Cup: 2014–15

Skënderbeu Korçë
Kategoria Superiore: 2017–18
Albanian Cup: 2017–18

References

External links

1995 births
Living people
Footballers from Belgrade
Kosovan footballers
Kosovo international footballers
Kosovan expatriate footballers
Kosovan expatriate sportspeople in North Macedonia
Kosovan expatriate sportspeople in Albania
Kosovan expatriate sportspeople in Greece
Kosovan expatriate sportspeople in Bulgaria
Kosovan expatriate sportspeople in Poland
Kosovan expatriate sportspeople in Bosnia and Herzegovina
Kosovan expatriate sportspeople in Croatia
Macedonian footballers
Macedonian people of Kosovan descent
Albanians in North Macedonia
Albanian footballers from North Macedonia
Macedonian expatriate footballers
Macedonian expatriate sportspeople in Albania
Macedonian expatriate sportspeople in Greece
Macedonian expatriate sportspeople in Bulgaria
Macedonian expatriate sportspeople in Poland
Macedonian expatriate sportspeople in Bosnia and Herzegovina
Macedonian expatriate sportspeople in Croatia
Albanian footballers
Albanian people of Kosovan descent
Albanian expatriate footballers
Albanian expatriate sportspeople in North Macedonia
Albanian expatriate sportspeople in Greece
Albanian expatriate sportspeople in Bulgaria
Albanian expatriate sportspeople in Poland
Albanian expatriate sportspeople in Bosnia and Herzegovina
Albanian expatriate sportspeople in Croatia
Association football wingers
Football Superleague of Kosovo players
KF Hajvalia players
KF Llapi players
Macedonian First Football League players
FK Rabotnički players
Kategoria Superiore players
KF Skënderbeu Korçë players
Super League Greece players
Athlitiki Enosi Larissa F.C. players
First Professional Football League (Bulgaria) players
FC Septemvri Sofia players
Ekstraklasa players
Wisła Płock players
Premier League of Bosnia and Herzegovina players
HŠK Zrinjski Mostar players
Croatian Football League players
HNK Šibenik players